Strines is a village in Greater Manchester, in the valley of the River Goyt. It is located midway between Marple and New Mills, about six miles south-east of Stockport. The village falls within the Marple parish and the Metropolitan Borough of Stockport. Immediately surrounding Strines are the villages of Woodend, Hague Bar and Brookbottom, where there is a conservation area. Close by are the villages of Mellor and Rowarth, and the hamlet of Turf Lea.

Transport

The village is served by Strines railway station on the Hope Valley Line. The station, and all stopping services, are operated  by Northern Trains.  It has a two-hourly daily daytime service each way between New Mills and Manchester Piccadilly, with additional calls during weekday peak periods.  On Saturdays and Sundays, most eastbound services continue through to Sheffield.

The 358 bus route, which runs between Stockport and Hayfield, passes through Strines; buses are operated by Stagecoach Manchester.

Strines Print Works 

Strines had a print works from 1792 to 2001. From 1899 it was one of the Calico Printers' Association mills. The works reservoir remains, with a Grade II listed "Chinese" dovecote in its centre dating from at least 1853.

See also

Listed buildings in Marple, Greater Manchester

References

External links

 Strines Community Website

Villages in Greater Manchester
Towns and villages of the Peak District
Geography of the Metropolitan Borough of Stockport